Candiac is an organized hamlet located at the intersection of Highway 48 and Highway 617 in the southeast quadrant of Saskatchewan, Canada.  It is directly south of Wolseley, and between Montmartre and Glenavon, approximately one hour's drive southeast of the provincial capital Regina.  It is no longer listed as a separate community by Statistics Canada, and is considered part of the Rural Municipality of Montmartre #126.  The population within the community's boundary is less than 50. Besides some bush on the northern end of the town, it is surrounded by open fields and pasture.

Primary income of community members is derived from agricultural businesses (farming, ranching).

History 
During the early 1900s, settlers came from east-central Europe, being specifically of German, Polish, and Ukrainian origin.  There is a known Polish settlement dated 1896. It has been proposed that the earliest settlement of Ukrainians in Canada was near the town.

At one time, there were two schools that offered education up to grade 12.

Demographics 

Places of interest
Churches - one (Polish Catholic, built in 1913) 
Community hall

See also
List of Saskatchewan provincial highways
List of communities in Saskatchewan

References

Designated places in Saskatchewan
Montmartre No. 126, Saskatchewan
Organized hamlets in Saskatchewan
Division No. 6, Saskatchewan